Elim Bible Institute and College is a private Christian college in Lima, New York. It awards bachelor's degrees, an associate degree, and certificates.

History
Elim was founded in 1924 in Endwell, New York, by Ivan and Minnie Spencer. The school is named for a biblical location named in Exodus 15:27, wherein Elim was an oasis in the wilderness.

In the 1920s, the school moved to Rochester and Red Creek, and in 1932 to Hornell, where it was located until 1951, when the Spencers moved Elim to its current site in Lima.

Beginning in 1948, Elim was a center for the Latter Rain Movement.

Ivan Spencer headed Elim Bible Institute for many years. In 1949, he was succeeded in that position by his son, I. Carlton Spencer, who also led Elim Fellowship for many years. Subsequently, H. David Edwards and Mike Webster each served as president of the institution. Paul Johansson, who was a student at Elim from 1956 to 1959, became the school's president in 1994. In 2006, Jeff Clark, who completed his own studies at Elim in 1978, succeeded Johansson as president. In 2012, Michael Cavanaugh, founder of Elim Gospel Church and a 1976 graduate of Elim, succeeded Jeff Clark as President. In August of 2019, Dr. Fred Antonelli was elected as the new president of Elim Bible Institute and College and installed in May of 2020.

Campus history
The Elim campus in Lima was originally the site of Genesee Wesleyan Seminary (opened in 1831), one of the first coeducational schools in the United States. Genesee College was founded on the same campus in 1849. The two institutions shared the campus until 1870 when Genesee College relocated to Syracuse, where it became the basis of Syracuse University. The seminary continued to occupy the campus until it closed in 1941.

Shortly thereafter, the National Youth Administration (NYA), a New Deal project championed by Eleanor Roosevelt, briefly made the campus the location for one of the NYA's experimental resident work centers. The center provided vocational training to underprivileged students until its closure in the summer of 1942.

The Methodist Church operated Genesee Junior College at the site from 1947 to 1951, when Elim Bible Institute bought the  campus and buildings for $75,000.  Two campus buildings, Genesee Wesleyan Seminary and Genesee College Hall, were listed on the National Register of Historic Places in 1976.

Accreditation

For most of its history, Elim Bible Institute was not accredited and did not award degrees, thus avoiding violations of laws and regulations that prohibit the awarding of degrees by unaccredited institutions. In 2020, the institute was accredited by the Transnational Association of Christian Colleges and Schools.

Academics
Elim Bible Institute and College offers accredited degree programs in Biblical Theology and Business Management.

Related religious organizations
Elim Fellowship was formed in 1933 as an informal fellowship of churches, ministers, and missionaries originating from a nucleus of people who had attended Elim Bible Institute. The Fellowship continues to support Pentecostal and Charismatic churches, ministers, and missions, providing credentials and counsel for ministers, encouraging fellowship among local churches, sponsoring leadership seminars, and also serving as a transdenominational agency sending missionaries and other personnel to other countries.

Elim Life Church (formerly Elim Gospel Church), an interdenominational Full Gospel church, was established near the Elim campus in 1988 and is attended by a significant number of the Institute's faculty and students.

Notable alumni

Randall Terry (class of 1981) and Rob Schenck founded the anti-abortion activist group Operation Rescue after studying together at Elim in the early 1980s. Their activism was motivated by their exposure at Elim to the teachings of theologian Francis Schaeffer, whose then-recent book A Christian Manifesto encouraged evangelicals to engage in political activism to combat secular humanism.

Anti-abortion activist and religious leader Paul Schenck, twin brother of Rob Schenck, also attended Elim.

Pastor Marvin Byers was a minister ordained by the Elim Fellowship who had studied in 1966 to 1969, in the year 1977 he was invited to minister in Guatemala City, where the Lord called him to share the Gospel of Jesus Christ to the people hungry for God in Guatemala and Latin America. God decided that he should stay there to form a ministry called Hebron Ministries which is still headquartered in Guatemala City.

See also
Latter Rain

References

External links
 

Unaccredited Christian universities and colleges in the United States
Seminaries and theological colleges in New York (state)
Educational institutions established in 1924
Bible colleges
Education in Livingston County, New York
Evangelicalism in New York (state)
Hornell, New York
Transnational Association of Christian Colleges and Schools
1924 establishments in New York (state)